Robert Roberts Taylor Blyth (2 June 1900 – 1956) was a Scottish professional footballer in the 1920s.

Football career
Blyth was born in Muirkirk Scotland – his father was the Portsmouth player Bob Blyth, who went on to manage Portsmouth from 1901 to 1904 and his cousins included Bill Shankly and Bob Shankly.

He made eight appearances for Portsmouth in the 1921–22 season before joining Southampton in January 1922. He again only made eight appearances for the "Saints", replacing Charlie Brown, before leaving the club for a brief football career in the United States.

In 1924, he signed with the Boston Wonder Workers of the American Soccer League, but saw time in only two games.

References

1900 births
1956 deaths
Footballers from East Ayrshire
Scottish footballers
Portsmouth F.C. players
Southampton F.C. players
English Football League players
American Soccer League (1921–1933) players
Boston Soccer Club players
Association football forwards
Scottish expatriate sportspeople in the United States
Expatriate soccer players in the United States
Scottish expatriate footballers